The CVV 8 Bonaventura was a two-seat competition glider designed and built in Italy during the 1950s. Fifteen were produced.

Design and development
The Bonaventura was designed at the Centro Volo a Vela (CVV), or Experimental Soaring Centre, of the Royal Polytechnic of Milan by Gildo Preti; though construction was started in 1952, the prototype was not completed until 1957.  The first flight took place on 14 December that year. It was named after the fortunate eponymous protagonist of an Italian children's comic strip, Signor Bonaventura.

The Bonaventura is an all wood aircraft with a 19 m (62 ft 4 in) span, shoulder mounted wing, built around a single spar.  Its airfoil section is from the NACA laminar flow 6-series. Ahead of the spar, the wing is skinned with plywood laid with its grain at 45° to the centre line for strength; this goes around the nose of the wing, forming a torsion resisting D-box.  Behind the spar the wing is fabric covered. The plan is essentially double straight tapered, though a short centre section has a leading edge normal to the fuselage centre line, and a trailing edge slightly more forward sweep than outboard.  Long, narrow chord ailerons occupy about half the span; airbrakes are placed immediately inboard of the ailerons at mid-chord.  These consist of seven rotating blades on each side which project both above and below the wing when deployed, counter-rotating away on chord-wise axes.

The fuselage is a ply shell, ovoid in cross section and built around a series of frames and stringers. The tandem seats are enclosed ahead of the wing leading edge under a starboard hinged, continuous canopy. The Bonaventura has no wheeled undercarriage, but took off from a wheeled, drop-off dolly and landed on a simple, rubber sprung skid extending from nose to mid chord, aided by a sprung tail skid.  The fuselage becomes slim towards the tail, where the double straight tapered horizontal tail is mounted on top of it, far enough forward that its trailing edge is at the rudder hinge.  The  elevators are fabric covered and the starboard one carries a trim tab. Fin and rudder are also straight tapered and the tall, fabric covered, unbalanced rudder reaches down to the keel.

Operational history
Two  Bonaventura prototypes were built by CVV, followed by a short production run of thirteen from Avionautica Rio.  These went to Italian gliding clubs.  Three Bonaventuras survive in museum collections, though none were on public display in 2010.

Specifications

References

External links
NACA 653618 airfoil

1950s Italian sailplanes
Aircraft first flown in 1957